The Oliy Majlis (Cyrillic Олий Мажлис) is the parliament of Uzbekistan. 
It succeeded the Supreme Council of the Republic of Uzbekistan in 1995, and was unicameral until a reform implemented in January 2005 created a second chamber.

The legislative chamber has 150 deputies elected from territorial constituencies. The Senate has 100 members, 84 elected from the regions, from the Autonomous Republic of Karakalpakstan and from the capital, Tashkent, and an additional 16 nominated by the President of Uzbekistan.

Both houses have five-year terms.

History

Supreme Soviet of the Uzbek SSR 

The Supreme Soviet of the Uzbek SSR operated in the country during the Soviet era as its main legislature. Since its establishment in July 1938, when it succeeded the All-Uzbek Congress of Soviets, it has held 12 convocations:
1st convocation (1938–1946)
2nd convocation (1947–1950) 
3rd convocation (1951–1954)
4th convocation (1955–1959)
5th convocation (1959–1962)
6th convocation (1963–1966)
7th convocation (1967–1970)
8th convocation (1971–1974) 
9th convocation (1975–1979)
10th convocation (1980–1984)
11th convocation (1985–1989)
12th convocation (1990–1994)

On 31 August 1991, during an extraordinary 6th session of the Supreme Soviet, the independence and sovereignty of Uzbekistan was proclaimed. In 1992, the Soviet was renamed to reflect the country's new independence status. After the last convocation, the Supreme Soviet was dissolved and converted into the Supreme Assembly in February 1995.

Office holders

From February 1995 to January 2005, the Chairman of the unicameral Supreme Assembly of Uzbekistan was Erkin Khalilov, who had been Acting Chairman of the Supreme Soviet from 1993 to 1995. Since 2005 the Senate and Legislative Chamber have each had their own presiding officer.

Speaker of the Legislative Chamber
Erkin Khalilov (January 27, 2005 – January 23, 2008)
Diloram Tashmukhamedova (January 23, 2008 – January 12, 2015)
 (since January 12, 2015, Incumbent)

Chairman of the Senate
 (January 27, 2005 – February 24, 2006)
 (February 24, 2006 – January 22, 2015)
Nigmatilla Yuldashev (since January 22, 2015, Incumbent)
Tanzila Norbaeva (21 June 2019)

See also
List of Chairmen of the Supreme Soviet of the Uzbek Soviet Socialist Republic
Politics of Uzbekistan
List of legislatures by country

References

External links
Senate of the Oliy Majlis
Legislative Chamber of the Oliy Majlis

 
Uzbekistan
Politics of Uzbekistan
Political organisations based in Uzbekistan
Government of Uzbekistan
Uzbekistan
Uzbekistan
1995 establishments in Uzbekistan